"C'est Toi (It's You)" was the third single from Angela Winbush's solo debut, Sharp. "C'est Toi (It's You)" didn't do as well as her previous single "Run to Me" which reached top five; "C'est Toi (It's You)" peaked at number 47. It was her first single since her debut with Rene & Angela in 1980 to miss the top forty.

A video for "C'est Toi (It's You)" was released as a download on iTunes in May 2007. It is also part of YouTube's music video program with Universal Records .

Charts

Angela Winbush songs
1988 singles
Songs written by Angela Winbush
1987 songs
PolyGram singles